Windermere House is in Middle Street, Lancaster, Lancashire, England.  It is recorded in the National Heritage List for England as a designated Grade II listed building.  It originated as a school, and has since been converted into flats.

History

This was originally the site of a Bluecoat school built in 1772. In 1849–50 it was rebuilt and enlarged by the local architects Sharpe and Paley.  It then became known as the Lancaster Charity School for Girls.  It was paid for mainly by public subscription, but the Sharpe family contributed £25 towards it.  The school has since been converted into flats and is known as Windermere House.

Architecture

The building is constructed in sandstone with slate roofs.  The architectural style is Elizabethan Revival.  The plan is rectangular, with a small service wing to the rear.  The building is in two storeys, with a front of five slightly irregular bays.  Each of the bays contains a gabled dormer.  The entrance doorway is in the second bay from the left.  Above it is a niche containing the figures of two girls holding an inscription.  The windows are mullioned or mullioned and transomed, those in the upper storey having stepped heads.

See also

 Listed buildings in Lancaster, Lancashire
 List of works by Sharpe and Paley

References

External links
 Property website

Grade II listed buildings in Lancashire
Grade II listed houses
Windermere House
Sharpe and Paley buildings
Tudor Revival architecture in England